The Spaceborne Imaging Radar (SIR) – full name 'Spaceborne Imaging Radar-C/X-band Synthetic Aperture Radar (SIR-C/X-SAR)', is a synthetic aperture radar which flew on two separate shuttle missions. Once from the Space Shuttle Endeavour in April 1994 on (STS-59) and again in October 1994 on (STS-68). The radar was run by NASA's Space Radar Laboratory. SIR utilizes 3 radar frequencies: L band (24 cm wavelength), C band (6 cm) and X band (3 cm), allowing for study of geology, hydrology, ecology and oceanography. Comparing radar images to data collected by teams of people on the ground as well as aircraft and ships using simultaneous measurements of vegetation, soil moisture, sea state, snow and weather conditions during each flight. The imaging radar was able to take images anytime regardless of clouds cover. The Radar-C system was built and operated by NASA's Jet Propulsion Laboratory (JPL). The mission was a joint work of NASA with the German and Italian space agencies. Each of the week long mission scanned about 50 million square kilometers of the Earth's surface, (19.3 million square miles).

The SIR mission revealed hidden river channels in the Sahara Desert indicating significant climate change in the past. SIR was also used for volcano research by keeping researchers a safe distance from hazardous and often inaccessible areas. The radar was also used to generate detailed three dimensional mappings of the Earth's surface.

Radar also found temples in Angkor, and ancient segments of China's Great Wall.

Specification
Orbital altitude above earth = 
The width of the imaged swath on the ground =  
C-band beamwidth = 0.25 deg. × 5 deg. 
L-band beamwidth = 1.1 deg. × 6 deg.
Scan angle range = ±23 deg. from boresight across narrow antenna direction only
Bandwidth = 10, 20 and 40 GHz
Pulse repetition rate =	1395–1736 pulses per second
Total science data = 50 hours per channel, per mission (two missions, total 100 hours) 
Total instrument mass = 
DC power consumption = 3000–9000 Watts
L-band data rate = 90 Mbit/s 	
C-band data rate = 90 Mbit/s 
X-band data rate = 45 Mbit/s
L-band wavelength = 0.235 m 	
C-band Wavelength = 0.058 m 	
X-band wavelength = 0.031 m

See also 

 Seasat – Seasat Synthetic Aperture Radar (SAR) in 1978
 STS-2 with SIR-A
 STS-41-G with SIR-B
 Shuttle Radar Topography Mission
 TerraSAR-X
 Earth Radiation Budget Satellite
 TopSat

References

Spacecraft instruments
1994 in spaceflight
Satellite meteorology
Space synthetic aperture radar
Satellite imaging sensors